The Dingleton Hill Covered Bridge, also known as the Cornish Mills Bridge, is a historic wooden covered bridge, carrying Root Hill Road over Mill Brook in Cornish Mills, New Hampshire.  Built in 1882, it is one of the state's few surviving 19th-century covered bridges.  It was listed on the National Register of Historic Places in 1978.  It carries one lane of traffic, with a posted weight limit.

Description and history 
The bridge is a single span kingspost truss structure running , resting on an original stone abutment and a 1954 concrete abutment. Its original wood-shingle roof has been replaced by corrugated metal. Only the lower half of the trusses are sheathed with vertical planking; the upper half is exposed. The upper portion of the portals are finished in vertical board siding.

The bridge was built in 1882 by James Tasker, a local builder, at a cost to the town of $812.  It underwent a major restoration in 1983 by Milton Graton, after which there was a rededication ceremony attended by one of Tasker's descendants.  The bridge was damaged in 2016 when a school bus (overweight for the posted limit, and overheight for its portals) crossed the bridge; the damage was repaired and the bridge reopened several months later.

See also

Other covered bridges in Cornish
 Blow-Me-Down Covered Bridge
 Blacksmith Shop Bridge, foot traffic only
 Cornish-Windsor Covered Bridge

Covered bridges in nearby West Windsor, Vermont
 Bowers Covered Bridge
 Best's Covered Bridge

Lists of bridges
List of New Hampshire covered bridges

National Register listings of area bridges
National Register of Historic Places listings in Sullivan County, New Hampshire
List of bridges on the National Register of Historic Places in New Hampshire

References

Covered bridges on the National Register of Historic Places in New Hampshire
Bridges completed in 1882
Bridges in Sullivan County, New Hampshire
National Register of Historic Places in Sullivan County, New Hampshire
Cornish, New Hampshire
Road bridges on the National Register of Historic Places in New Hampshire
Wooden bridges in New Hampshire
King post truss bridges in the United States